Dallas Turner (born February 2, 2003) is an American football outside linebacker for the Alabama Crimson Tide.

Early life and high school career
Turner grew up in Fort Lauderdale, Florida, and initially attended the American Heritage School in Plantation, Florida. As a junior, he was named the area Defensive Player of the Year by the Sun-Sentinel after finishing the season with 74 tackles, 18 tackles for loss, 15 sacks, and three forced fumbles. After the season Turner transferred to St. Thomas Aquinas High School in Fort Lauderdale, Florida. Turner was rated a five-star recruit and committed to play college football at Alabama entering his senior season after considering offers from Florida, Georgia, Michigan, and Oklahoma. He had 36 tackles, 25 tackles for loss, and 13 sacks as a senior.

College career
Turner began his freshman season as part of Alabama's defensive pass rush rotation before starting his first career game against Texas A&M. Turner was named to the Southeastern Conference (SEC) All-Freshman team.

References

External links
Alabama Crimson Tide bio

2003 births
Living people
Players of American football from Florida
American football outside linebackers
Alabama Crimson Tide football players
St. Thomas Aquinas High School (Florida) alumni